The 1922 Massachusetts gubernatorial election was held on November 7, 1922.

Incumbent Governor Channing H. Cox was re-elected over U.S. Representative John F. "Honey Fitz" Fitzgerald for a second term in office.

Republican primary

Governor

Candidates

Declared
J. Weston Allen, Massachusetts Attorney General
Channing H. Cox, incumbent Governor

Results

Lieutenant Governor

Candidates

Declared
Alvan T. Fuller, incumbent Lieutenant Governor
Joseph E. Warner, Speaker of the Massachusetts House of Representatives

Results
Incumbent Lt. Governor Alvan Fuller defeated former Speaker of the State House Joseph Warner for the nomination in a rematch of their 1920 contest.

Democratic primary

Governor

Candidates

Declared
Joseph B. Ely, former District Attorney for the Western District of Massachusetts
John F. Fitzgerald, former Mayor of Boston and U.S. Representative
Eugene Foss, former Governor
Peter F. Sullivan, Mayor of Worcester, Massachusetts

Results

Governor

Candidates

Declared
John J. Cummings
John F. Doherty, former State Representative from Fall River
Michael A O'Leary

Results

Independents and third parties

Prohibition
John B. Lewis

Socialist
Walter S. Hutchins, nominee for Governor in 1920

Socialist Labor
Henry Hess

General election

Results

See also
 1921–1922 Massachusetts legislature

References

Bibliography

Governor
1922
Massachusetts
November 1922 events